Anibal Casis Godoy Lemus (born 10 February 1990) is a Panamanian professional footballer who plays as a defensive midfielder for Major League Soccer club Nashville SC and the Panama national team.

Club career
Godoy started his career at Chepo and moved abroad in November 2011 to join Godoy Cruz on loan to play alongside compatriot Armando Cooper after being voted Player of the Year in Panama. After returning to Chepo he moved to Europe in August 2013 when he signed for Hungarian side Honvéd Budapest. He made his debut for them on 1 September 2013 against Kaposvár Rákóczi.

San Jose Earthquakes
Godoy signed for MLS side San Jose Earthquakes on 6 August 2015. On 30 November 2017, he signed a new, multi-year contract with the club. He took on the role of vice-captain during the 2018 season.

Nashville SC
On 7 August 2019, it was announced that at the conclusion of the 2019 season, Godoy would move to Nashville SC ahead of their inaugural MLS season in 2020. San Jose would receive  $650,000 of General Allocation Money in return.

International career
With the Panama under-20 team, Godoy participated in the 2007 FIFA U-20 World Cup in Canada.

Godoy made his senior debut for Panama in a March 2010 friendly match against Venezuela and has, as of October 2021, earned a total of over 110 caps, scoring three goals. He also played at the 2011 and 2013 Gold Cups.

Godoy represented Panama in all four of its 2017 Gold Cup matches, comprising three group stage matches and one quarter-final. He tallied one assist and was named to the Best XI of the group stages, but ultimately scored an own goal in Panama's quarter-final match against Costa Rica and club teammate Marco Ureña, resulting in the end of the tournament for Panama and Costa Rica's advancement to the semi-finals.

During the lead-up to the 2018 World Cup, Godoy was called up to the squad for friendlies against Denmark and Switzerland on 22 and 27 March, respectively, along with San Jose teammate Harold Cummings. In May 2018, he was named in Panama's preliminary 35 man squad for the 2018 World Cup in Russia.

Personal life
As of 27 February 2018, Godoy holds a U.S. green card, qualifying him as a domestic player for MLS roster purposes.

Career statistics

Club

International

International goals
Scores and results list Panama's goal tally first.

See also
 List of men's footballers with 100 or more international caps

References

External links

 Player profile – Honvéd

1990 births
Living people
Sportspeople from Panama City
Association football midfielders
Panamanian footballers
Panama international footballers
Chepo FC players
Godoy Cruz Antonio Tomba footballers
Budapest Honvéd FC players
San Jose Earthquakes players
Nashville SC players
Liga Panameña de Fútbol players
Nemzeti Bajnokság I players
Panamanian expatriate footballers
Expatriate footballers in Argentina
Expatriate footballers in Hungary
Expatriate soccer players in the United States
Panamanian expatriate sportspeople in Argentina
Panamanian expatriate sportspeople in Hungary
Panamanian expatriate sportspeople in the United States
Major League Soccer players
Argentine Primera División players
2011 CONCACAF Gold Cup players
2013 Copa Centroamericana players
2013 CONCACAF Gold Cup players
2015 CONCACAF Gold Cup players
Copa América Centenario players
2017 Copa Centroamericana players
2017 CONCACAF Gold Cup players
2018 FIFA World Cup players
Panama under-20 international footballers
Panama youth international footballers
FIFA Century Club